The 1955 Hong Kong Urban Council election was held on 30 March 1955 for the two of the four elected seats of the Urban Council of Hong Kong. It was the fourth Urban Council election in the post-war period.

The turnout was low compared to last year as only 3,650 voters cast their votes, 1,540 ballots from Hong Kong Island and 374 from Kowloon. Brook Bernacchi and Woo Pak-chuen of the Reform Club were reelected. G.O. Jones who ran against the Reform Club for the third time was defeated.

Outcome of election

Citations

References
 Pepper, Suzanne (2008). Keeping Democracy at Bay: Hong Kong and the Challenge of Chinese Political Reform. Rowman & Littlefield.
 Lau, Y.W. (2002). A history of the municipal councils of Hong Kong: 1883-1999: from the Sanitary Board to the Urban Council and the Regional Council. Leisure and Cultural Service Dept.

1955 elections in Asia
1955 in Hong Kong
Urban
March 1955 events in Asia
1955 elections in the British Empire